Tom at the Farm is a 2013 Canadian psychological thriller film directed by and starring Xavier Dolan. The film is based on the play of the same name by Michel Marc Bouchard, who co-wrote the screenplay with Dolan. It was screened in the main competition section at the 70th Venice International Film Festival in 2013, and also at the 2013 Toronto International Film Festival.

At Venice, the film won the FIPRESCI Prize. Tom at the Farm was also nominated for eight Canadian Screen Awards, including Best Motion Picture.

Plot
When his boyfriend Guillaume dies at 25, Tom, a youthful advertising editor from Montreal, visits Guillaume's rural community to deliver a eulogy at the funeral. He meets Guillaume's mother Agathe Longchamp, who does not know Guillaume was gay and that Tom was his lover. When Tom agrees to stay at the farm house, he is surprised when Agathe tells him Guillaume has a brother, Francis. Later that night, Tom is awakened by Francis, who menacingly says he knew Tom would come, and tells him to give an agreeable eulogy and not to posthumously out Guillaume, to please Agathe. At the funeral, Tom belatedly decides not to speak, and music is played instead. Francis afterwards confronts Tom in a bathroom stall about the mishap. At the farm home, Tom tells Agathe he made his decision because he was dissatisfied with the writing quality of his eulogy. Agathe knows Guillaume had a lover, but believes it was a young woman, Guillaume and Tom's co-worker Sarah. Tom reads his eulogy on the pretence that Sarah wrote it, and makes hints at Sarah's sexual habits.

Although the funeral has passed, Tom remains at the farm and begins helping Francis with the chores, particularly milking and calving. Francis remains intense towards him, although they dance in the barn, and Francis tells Agathe they named a calf Bitch Ass, in Tom's honour. One night, Francis arrives at the farm house and is surprised to find Sarah with Agathe. When alone with Sarah, Francis deduces Tom has contacted her and persuaded her to come to the farm and pose as Guillaume's girlfriend, attacking and making threatening sexual advances on her. Sarah meets with Tom, who says the farm feels real to him and that his work is needed. Sarah tells him Guillaume had numerous affairs, including with her, and complains about Francis. The group meets in the living room, where Agathe becomes overwhelmed with questions about Sarah's apparent lack of grief, why Guillaume fell out with the family and who was with Guillaume when he died.

Tom visits the local bar, where he strikes a conversation with the bartender. When Tom mentions he is staying at the Longchamp farm, the bartender informs him Francis is banned from the establishment. Years ago, Francis and Guillaume were at the bar with another man. When the young man dancing with Guillaume told Francis he had something to say about Guillaume, Francis viciously assaulted him, tearing into his face with his hands. The young man afterwards disappeared, rumoured to be living in another village. After being chased by Francis and leaving the community, Tom spots a man at a service station with facial scars matching the bartender's described attack.

Cast
 Xavier Dolan as Tom Podowski
 Pierre-Yves Cardinal as Francis Longchamp
 Lise Roy as Agathe Longchamp
 Evelyne Brochu as Sarah Thibault
 Manuel Tadros as Barman

Production

Development
After completing his 2012 feature film Laurence Anyways, Dolan felt that "a change of direction was needed" since, in his own words, the previous three movies dealt with the "subject of impossible love". Having seen a production of the play a year earlier, he met Bouchard at the Théâtre d'Aujourd'hui after the performance and asked him if anyone else was directing a film adaptation, before saying he would. He was fascinated by the play's violence and brutality and felt it could be explored further on screen. Dolan also liked the role of the mother in the play, since "mothers and sons, .. exhausted mothers is always appealing" to him.

It was the first time Dolan attempted an adaptation of previously published material. Writing with Bouchard was rushed, as Dolan wished for filming to begin in October 2012.

Filming
Dolan remade his appearance for the part of Tom, based on the colour of the backdrop, particularly cornfields. Lise Roy played Agathe in stage performances of Tom at the Farm, with Dolan assuring her she would have the film role after seeing her in the play. Roy found it different to be on an actual farm and said she was challenged by what she found to be a lonely shoot. For one scene, Dolan ran through a cornfield. He was warned it could be dangerous, but because it had been raining he didn't suffer any cuts.

Dolan shot a scene where Francis masturbates Tom while choking him, but Dolan ultimately decided to edit this out. Originally, Dolan had the idea to not use music in the film. He thought that silence and sounds of "howling wind, creaking floorboards" would increase the tension. This idea was scrapped during the editing process, and he asked the Academy Award-winning composer Gabriel Yared to create the score for the film.

Release

The film played at the 70th Venice International Film Festival on 2 September 2013, where it had its debut and the audience stood to applaud. It also at the 2013 Toronto International Film Festival in the Special Presentation section.

Distributed by Les Films Séville, Tom at the Farm had a wider cinematic release in 2014. It opened on 30 May in Toronto and Vancouver, followed by screenings in Victoria, British Columbia on 20 June. Due to Dolan not being well-known in the U.S., and his films being released there by no one company, its release in that country took place on 14 August 2015 after his 2014 film Mommy sparked interest.

Reception

Critical reception
Tom at the Farm has received generally favorable reviews. Review aggregation website Rotten Tomatoes reports that 77% of critics have given the film a positive review based on 70 reviews, with an average score of 7.1/10.  In Canada, La Presse critic  gave it three and a half stars, finding it distinct from Dolan's previous works, more Hitchcockian, and praising André Turpin's photography and how Yared's score complemented the story. Eric Moreault gave it three and a half stars, writing that with its psychology, the film owed as much to Ingmar Bergman as Alfred Hitchcock. In Voir, Manon Dumais praised Dolan for building on Turpin's photography and Yared's music and drawing on thriller and horror film elements to capture the repressed family and community. Kate Taylor wrote a negative review in The Globe and Mail, criticizing Dolan for reusing similar shots and questioning why Francis would become a social pariah rather than go to prison.

Peter Bradshaw of The Guardian described it as an "intriguing [film] coiled with ardor and fear". Irish Times''' Tara Brady gave it five out of five stars and hailed it as a "work of genius", in which Dolan "transforms Michel Marc Bouchard's source stage play into a unique, enigmatic thriller". Varietys Guy Lodge also wrote a positive review of the film, citing it as "Dolan's most accomplished and enjoyable work to date, ... also his most commercially viable". He praised the "glorious" score by Yared and the "gorgeous" cinematography of André Turpin. David Ehrlich in his review for Film.com gave the film a rating of 7.7, writing that Tom at the Farm is "seldom less than gripping as an exercise in suspense". Ehrlich also noted the score as "urgently bleating".The Hollywood Reporter's critic David Rooney reviewed the film unfavorably and criticized Dolan for being self-obsessed. He wrote: "It's also hard to take the film seriously when scene after scene explores the director's face with such swooning intoxication. Shots of Tom are held and held and then held some more—at the wheel of his car, in the cornfields, running in slow motion with his blond locks dancing in the breeze, sitting pensively on a bed in his underwear, or looking out through a screen door as a single tear streaks his face, like Anne Hathaway in Les Miserables". Dolan replied to Rooney in a tweet: "You can kiss my narcissistic ass".

Accolades
In nominations, Tom at the Farm was a major contender at the 2nd Canadian Screen Awards, where it was competing for Best Motion Picture. Dolan was a favourite at the 17th Jutra Awards, where his films Tom at the Farm and Mommy'' were pitted against each other in several categories, including Best Film.

References

External links
 

2013 films
2013 drama films
2010s psychological drama films
2013 LGBT-related films
2013 psychological thriller films
Canadian drama films
French drama films
2010s French-language films
Films directed by Xavier Dolan
Canadian LGBT-related films
LGBT-related drama films
Films scored by Gabriel Yared
Films set on farms
Films based on Canadian plays
French LGBT-related films
Gay-related films
French-language Canadian films
2010s Canadian films
2010s French films